Joaquim António Oliveira Duarte (born 19 March 1943) is a former Portuguese footballer who played as defender.

Football career 

Oliveira Duarte gained 1 cap for Portugal against Sweden in Lisbon 13 November 1966, in a 1-2 defeat.

External links 
 
 

1943 births
Living people
Portuguese footballers
Association football defenders
Primeira Liga players
Sporting CP footballers
Portugal international footballers